TY Coronae Borealis, also known as Ross 808, is a variable white dwarf star of the DAV (or ZZ Ceti) type in the constellation Corona Borealis. It has a surface temperature of 11,213 ± 130 K and a mass around 70% times that of the Sun, but only 1.1% of its diameter. It is 107 light-years distant from Earth. It was confirmed as a variable star in 1976.

References

Corona Borealis
Pulsating white dwarfs
Coronae Borealis, TY